Vazneh Sar is a village in Darram Rural District, in the Central District of Tarom County, Zanjan Province, Iran. At the 2006 census, its population was 58, in 19 families.

References 

Populated places in Tarom County